Mangifera persiciformis is a species of plant in the family Anacardiaceae. It is endemic to southwestern China, where it is found in Funing County, Yunnan; southwestern Guizhou; and southern Guangxi.

References

persiciformis
Endemic flora of China
Data deficient plants
Taxonomy articles created by Polbot